Proto-Avar is the unattested, reconstructed proto-language of the Avar–Andic languages, part of the Northeast Caucasian languages.

References

Avar language
Andic languages